"You Broke Up with Me" is a song co-written and recorded by American country music singer Walker Hayes. It is his third chart entry overall, as well as his first entry on the Billboard Hot 100, and his first single for Monument Records Nashville. It is included on his major-label debut album boom.  The song was written by Hayes, Kylie Sackley and Thomas Archer.

Content
The song is about a man who is confronted at a party by his ex-girlfriend, and rebuffs her by saying "you broke up with me". Hayes said that the song was inspired by his relationship with the Nashville music scene following a previously lost deal with Capitol Records, and telling those in the music industry that they "broke up" with him. Before recording the song on Monument, Hayes recorded an earlier version of the song on an EP released independently via Shane McAnally's SMACKSongs.

Music video 
The music video was directed by Blythe Thomas.

Commercial performance
The song peaked at No. 9 on Hot Country Songs for charts dated February 17, 2018 where it stayed for 3 weeks.   was certified Platinum by the RIAA on April 9, 2018. It has sold 397,000 copies in the United States as of March 2018.

Charts

Weekly charts

Year-end charts

Certifications

References

2017 singles
2017 songs
Walker Hayes songs
Monument Records singles
Songs written by Kylie Sackley
Song recordings produced by Shane McAnally